The Beijing Shougang Ducks (simplified Chinese: 北京首钢鸭俱乐部篮球队), also known as Beijing Shougang or Beijing Ducks, are a professional basketball team based in Beijing, China, which plays in the North Division of the Chinese Basketball Association. The Shougang Corporation is the club's corporate sponsor while its mascot is a duck.

The team was formerly known as the Beijing Jinyu Ducks or Beijing Jinyu (北京金隅, běijīng jīnyü). The name change was due to a change in corporate sponsorship. This organization should not be confused with the Beijing Olympians, a different club, which was founded in 1955.

For at least part of the 2003–04 CBA season, the Ducks were known as Beijing Wanfeng Aote (北京万丰奥特). Their naming rights were then assumed by the "Beijing Jinyu Group Co., Ltd.", a prominent construction materials conglomerate in China.

History

The Beijing Ducks were initially formed as the Beijing Men's Basketball Team in 1956. In October of that same year, the National Basketball League's season was held in Chongqing. Beijing's club, with only 7 players registered on its roster, won the championship of that NBL edition. The team managed a third-place finish in the same competition when the tournament was held in Hangzhou in 1961.

In 1988, the club was first sponsored by the Shougang Corporation, and was renamed Beijing Shougang. When the duck was confirmed as the team's mascot in 1995, the club participated in the inaugural season of the Chinese Basketball Association as the Beijing Shougang Ducks Basketball Team. In October 1997, the Shougang Corporation moved to once again rebrand the club as the Beijing Shougang Basketball Team, in an ultimately fruitless attempt to give the corporate name greater popular precedence than the mascot.

The club had a formidable frontcourt duo in the early days of CBA competition with Mengke Bateer, who debuted for Beijing at the age of 18, and Shan Tao, who was considered to be one of the top Chinese centers at that time. The two helped the Ducks to a third-place finish in the team's CBA debut season.

During the 2004–05 CBA season, the Ducks finished in second place in the North Division, but lost in the Quarter-Finals of the CBA Playoffs to the South Division's Bayi Rockets. In 2008, the team visited the United States, training at Marquette University and the Milwaukee School of Engineering in Wisconsin, as well as visiting Philadelphia, Madison, Wisconsin, and Eugene, Oregon.

Beijing started the 2011–12 season with a 13-game winning streak, and eventually finished second in the regular season. The club then advanced to its first CBA Finals match-up, thanks largely to the play of former NBA All-Star Stephon Marbury. They won their first CBA title by defeating the Guangdong Southern Tigers 4 games to 1. The Ducks are the first-ever CBA team to earn the title without any previous trips to the CBA Finals, as well as the league's fourth different club to win a championship.

After being eliminated in the Semi-Finals of the 2013 CBA Playoffs, Beijing returned to the Finals at the end of the 2013–14 campaign and won their second trophy. The Ducks then repeated as champions in 2014–15, making it three titles in four years.

Trophies
Chinese Basketball Association
Champions (3): 2011–12, 2013–14, 2014–15

Roster

Notable players 
- Set a club record or won an individual award as a professional player.
- Played at least one official international match for his senior national team at any time.

 Mengke Bateer (1997–2002, 2005–2006, 2013–2014)
 Zhang Yunsong (1998–2010)
 Chris Herren (2002–2003)
 Olumide Oyedeji (2004)
 Ji Zhe (2007–2018)
 David Harrison (2008–2009)
 Dontae' Jones (2008–2009)
 Fang Shuo (2008–present)
 Cedric Bozeman (2009–2010)
 Sun Mingming (2009–2014)
 Ernest Brown (2010)
 Steve Francis (2010)
 Joe Crawford (2010–2011)
 Lee Hsueh-lin (2010–2014)
 Randolph Morris (2010–2018)
 Stephon Marbury (2011–2017)
 Sun Yue (2013–2017)
 Zhai Xiaochuan (2011–present)
 Li Gen (2012–2015)
 Damien Wilkins (2013–2014)
 Zhang Qingpeng (2014–2017)
 Grant Jerrett (2016–2017)
 Aaron Jackson (2017–2019)
 Justin Hamilton (2017–present)
 Marcus Thornton (2018)
 Jeremy Lin (2019–2022)
 Ekpe Udoh (2019–2020)
 Jordan McRae (2020–2021)
 Jonathan Gibson (2020–present)

Head coaches
   Yannis Christopoulos: (2017–2020, 2021–2022)
   Charis Markopoulos: (2017–2022)

See also 
My Other Home, a 2017 film starring Stephon Marbury, based on Beijing Ducks' 2011–12 CBA championship run

References

External links 
 Team profile 
 Club profile

 
Chinese Basketball Association teams
Sport in Beijing
Basketball teams established in 1956
1956 establishments in China